Greg Thompson (born November 25, 1950) is a former American football coach and college athletics administrator. He served as head football coach at coach of the Morris Brown College in Atlanta, Georgia from 1981 to 1994 and Stillman College in Tuscaloosa, Alabama from 2006 to 2008, compiling career college football record of 70–92–4. Thompson was also the athletic director at Morris Brown from 1982 to 1995 and interim athletic director at Stillman from October 2004 to June 2005 and again from January through July 2007.

In November 1981, Thompson was named interim head coach for the final game of the season following the suspension of Lambert Reed for striking a player with an ax handle. Following the firing of Reed, Thompson was named the full-time head coach, and served in that capacity at Morris Brown from 1981 to 1995 and compiled an overall record of 50–89–4. After being fired from Morris Brown in December 1995, Thompson was hired as offensive coordinator at Clark Atlanta University (CAU) by Willie Hunter. At CAU, Thompson served as the offensive coordinator under Hunter through the 1998 season when he was moved to tight ends coach for the 1999 season. He was subsequently moved back to the offensive coordinator season midway through the 1999 season following the resignation of Elmer Mixon as head coach.

Thompson then returned to Morris Brown where he served as offensive coordinator from 2001 to 2002 under head coach Sol Brannan. Morris Brown subsequently fired Thompson in January 2003 in an effort to save money after the college lost its accreditation.

In 2004, Theophilus Danzy hired Thompson to serve as offensive coordinator at Stillman. In February 2006 he was named head coach after Danzy was resigned elsewhere in the athletic department. He was fired after the 2008 season and compiled an overall record of 16–16 during his tenure.

Head coaching record

References

Living people
1950 births
Clark Atlanta Panthers football coaches
Morris Brown College alumni
Morris Brown Wolverines athletic directors
Morris Brown Wolverines football coaches
Southern Jaguars football coaches
Stillman Tigers athletic directors
Stillman Tigers football coaches